Fritz Karl (born 21 December 1967) is an Austrian film, television and stage actor born in Gmunden, Upper Austria. He is one of the busiest Austrian actors.

Private life
Karl lives in both Munich and Vienna with his longtime companion Elena Uhlig. The two of them have two children, born in 2007 and 2010. He has three more children from a previous relationship.

Filmography

Film

Television

External links 

 

Living people
1967 births
People from Gmunden
Austrian male film actors
Austrian male television actors
Austrian male stage actors